Alister MacKenzie (30 August 1870 – 6 January 1934) was a golf course architect whose course designs span four continents. Originally trained as a surgeon, MacKenzie served as a civilian physician with the British Army during the Boer War where he first became aware of the principles of camouflage. During the First World War, MacKenzie made his own significant contributions to military camouflage, which he saw as closely related to golf course design. He is a member of the World Golf Hall of Fame. He designed more than 50 golf courses including three that remain in the 2022 top 10 golf courses in the world: They include Augusta National Golf Club and Cypress Point Club in the US, and Royal Melbourne Golf Club (West Course) in Australia.

Early years and education
MacKenzie was born on 30 August 1870 in Normanton, near Leeds in Yorkshire, England, to parents of Scottish extraction. His mother, Mary Jane Smith MacKenzie, had family roots in Glasgow. His father, William Scobie MacKenzie, a medical doctor, had been born and raised in the Scottish Highlands near Lochinver. Although christened after his paternal grandfather Alexander, he was called "Alister" (Gaelic for Alexander) from birth. As a youth, MacKenzie and his family spent summers near Lochinver, on what had been traditional Clan MacKenzie lands from 1670 to 1745. MacKenzie's strong identification with his Scottish roots featured prominently in many aspects of his later life.

MacKenzie attended Queen Elizabeth Grammar School, Wakefield, before going to Cambridge University, where he initially trained as a medical doctor, graduating in 1891 with a B.A. (Natural Science Tripos Part 1), with honours, third class, before the next year undertaking and passing a second MB (Bachelor of Medicine. Latin: Medicinae Baccalaureus) Anatomy. After a period working in Leeds, he returned to Cambridge in 1895 where he undertook the third MB examination (Part 1) before passing the London Licentiate examinations for Royal College of Surgeons the same year. Finally, in 1897 he graduated from Cambridge University, with MB BacS (Bachelor of Surgery), and MA degrees.

Wartime service
MacKenzie served as a surgeon with the Somerset Regiment in South Africa during the Second Boer War.

During his wartime service, MacKenzie became interested in camouflage, which was effectively used by the Boers. As a result, during the First World War, when he once again served in the army, he worked not as a surgeon but as a camoufleur. In a lecture he gave on the subject, he said that "the brilliant successes of the Boers (during his service in South Africa) were due to great extent to their making the best use of natural cover and the construction of artificial cover indistinguishable from nature."

Golf course design

MacKenzie had been a member of several golf clubs near Leeds, dating back as far as the late 1890s. These included Ilkley between 1890 and 1900 and Leeds Golf Club from 1900 to 1910. In 1907, he was one of the founding members of The Alwoodley Golf Club, where he was both honorary secretary (1907-1909) and club captain (1912-1913), and he remained on its green committee until 1930. As the course was MacKenzie's original design when Alwoodley was laid out, it was his first opportunity to put many of his design theories to practical test. However, the committee at the time thought that some of his ideas were too expansive, so it called in Harry Colt for a second opinion. Colt was one of the leading golf course architects of the time and was also the secretary of Sunningdale Golf Club. Colt visited on two occasions only: first on 31 July 1907, when he met MacKenzie for the first time, and later on 6 October 1909. On the first occasion, four months after the course opened for play, having stayed at MacKenzie's house overnight, he realized that MacKenzie's ideas were very much an extension of his own, and he gave great support for MacKenzie's ideas at the meeting with the committee. He did, however, mention the bunkering as MacKenzie's ideas had taken into account the new technology of the day, which was the Haskell wound ball (which bounced and rolled) and was now being used instead of the old gutta-percha golf ball. Some of MacKenzie's modern ideas under discussion included undulating greens, long and narrow greens angled from the center of the fairway, fairly large and free-form bunker shapes, and substantial additional contouring. All of these remained part of his "signature style" throughout his career.

In 1914, MacKenzie won a golf hole design competition organized by Country Life; the adjudicator was Bernard Darwin. MacKenzie then took an active interest in course improvements at his own clubs, gaining experience in the newly emerging discipline of golf course design. He charted the Old Course at St. Andrews in great detail; by 1915 he had become a member of the R&A. In March 1924, he produced a map which remains well-known to the present day.

Following the First World War, MacKenzie left medicine and began to work instead as a golf course designer in the United Kingdom, in association with Harry Colt and Charles Alison in 1919, with whom he formed the London firm of Colt, MacKenzie & Alison. Four years later, MacKenzie went his own way.

MacKenzie thought he had learned a lot about golf course planning from having designed camouflage. There are references to the latter in his first book on course design, called Golf Architecture (MacKenzie 1920), such as when he writes that "there is an extraordinary resemblance between what is now known as the camouflage of military earthworks and golf-course construction", or later, when he states that there "are many other attributes in common between the successful golf architect and the camoufleur. Both, if not actually artists, must have an artistic temperament, and have had an education in science." In the same book, he also writes that "the chief object of every golf course architect worth his salt is to imitate the beauties of nature [and presumably also the hazards] so closely as to make his work indistinguishable from nature itself." His book was later included in Herbert Warren Wind's Classics of Golf Library.

MacKenzie worked in an era before large scale earth moving became a major factor in golf course construction, and his designs are notable for their sensitivity to the nature of the original site.

Course chronology

 1905 - Cleckheaton & District Golf Club, Bradford, England
 1905 - Fulwell Golf Club, England
 1906 - Horsforth Golf Club, Leeds, England
 1907 - Alwoodley Golf Club, Leeds, England
 1908 - Darlington Golf Club, County Durham England
 1909 - Moortown Golf Club, Leeds, England<
 1912 - Reddish Vale Golf Course, Stockport, England
 1913 - Castletown Golf Links, Isle of Man
 1913 - Dewsbury District Golf Club, West Yorkshire, England
 1913 - Garforth Golf Club, Leeds, England
 1913 - Hazel Grove Golf Club, Cheshire, England
 1913 - Sitwell Park Golf Club, Rotherham, England
 1914 - Oakdale Golf Club, Harrogate, England
 1914 - Crosland Heath Golf Club, Linthwaite, England
 1919 - Sutton Coldfield Golf Club, North Warwickshire, England
 1920 - Bury Golf Club, Unsworth, England
 1920 - Felixstowe Ferry Golf Club, Felixstowe, England
 1921 - The Portland Course at the Royal Troon Golf Club, Troon, Scotland
 1922 - Hadley Wood Golf Course, Hadley Wood, Hertfordshire
 1922 - Stanmore Golf Club, Middlesex, England
 1922 - Pitreavie (Dunfermline) Golf Club, Fife, Scotland
 1922 - Bonnyton Golf Club, Eaglesham, Scotland
 1923 - Duff House Royal Golf Club, Aberdeenshire, Scotland
 1924 - Temple Newsam Golf Club, Leeds, England
 1924 - Douglas Golf Club, Cork, Ireland
 1924 - Canoe Brook Country Club South Course, Summit, New Jersey, USA
 1924 - Muskerry Golf Club, Cork, Ireland
 1924 - Bolton Old Links Golf Club, Bolton, Lancashire
 1924 - Burning Tree Club, Bethesda, Maryland, USA
 1924 - Teignmouth Golf Club, Devon, England
 1924 - Melrose Country Club, Cheltenham, Pennsylvania, USA
 1925 - Seaton Carew Golf Club Course, Seaton Carew, Durham County, England
 1925 - Stanley Park Golf Course, Stanley Park, Blackpool, England
 1925 - South Moor golf club (course re-design)
 1925 - Ravensworth Golf Club, Gateshead, England (re-design) 
 1925 - Galway Golf Club, Galway, Ireland.
 1925 - Low Laithes Golf Club, Wakefield, Yorkshire, England
 1925 - Cavendish Golf Club, Buxton, Derbyshire, England
 1925 - Willingdon Golf Club, Eastbourne, England
 1925 - Rhayader Golf Club, Cwmdauddwr, Radnorshire (now Powys), Wales
 1926 - Sand Moor Golf Club, Leeds, Yorkshire, England
 1926 - Titirangi Golf Club, Titirangi, Auckland, New Zealand
 1926 - Royal Adelaide Golf Club, Adelaide, Australia
 1926 - The Worcestershire Golf Club, Malvern, Worcestershire, England
 1926 - The Flinders Golf Club, Flinders, Victoria, Australia (consultant on existing design)
 1926 - The Royal Melbourne Golf Club, Australia
 1926 - New South Wales Golf Club, Sydney, Australia
 1927 - Worcester Golf & Country Club, Worcester, England
 1927 - Cork Golf Club, Cork, Ireland
 1927 - Hazlehead Park (MacKenzie Championship Course), Aberdeen, Scotland
 1927 - Lahinch Golf Club (Old Course), Ireland
 1927 - Blairgowie Golf Club (Rosemount Course), Perth and Kinross, Scotland
 1927 - Meadow Club, Fairfax, California, USA
 1927 - Redlands Country Club, Redlands, California, USA
 1927 - Douglas Golf Course, Pulrose, Isle of Man
 1928 - The Valley Club of Montecito Santa Barbara, California, USA
 1928 - Cypress Point Club, Monterey Peninsula, California, USA
 1928 - Northwood Golf Club, Monte Rio, California, USA
 1928 - :es:Fray Bentos Golf Club, Fray Bentos, Rio Negro, Uruguay
 1928 - Libertad Golf Club, Buenos Aires, Argentina
 1929 - Nenagh Golf Club, Co. Tipperary, Ireland
 1929 - Pasatiempo Golf Club, Santa Cruz, California, USA
 1929 - Claremont Country Club, Oakland, California, USA
 1929 - Crystal Downs Country Club, Frankfort, Michigan, USA
 1930 - Jockey Club (Buenos Aires) de San Isidro, Buenos Aires, Argentina
 1930 - Club de Golf del Uruguay (Punta Carretas), Montevideo, Uruguay
 1930 - Green Hills Country Club, Millbrae, California, USA
 1931 - Bingley St Ives Golf Course, Harden, Bingley, West Yorkshire, England
 1931 - Ohio State University Golf Club (Scarlet Course) at Ohio State University, Columbus, Ohio, USA
 1931 - St. Charles Country Club, Winnipeg, Manitoba; MacKenzie Nine
 1931 - University of Michigan Golf Course, University of Michigan, Ann Arbor, Michigan, USA
 1931 - Royal Melbourne Golf Club (West Course), Melbourne, Australia
 1932 - Sharp Park Golf Course, Pacifica, California, USA
 1932 - Haggin Oaks Golf Course, Sacramento, California, USA
 1932 - Pontefract and District Golf Club, West Yorkshire, England which incorporated a number of classic Mackenzie greens
 1933 - Augusta National Golf Club, Augusta, Georgia, USA
 1934 - Regent Park Golf Club, Bolton, England

Sources:

As a golfer
As a player, MacKenzie was self-described as a "good putter, but a mediocre ball striker" for most of his life. It was not until after his move to California, when he was already in his 60s, that MacKenzie had what he described as his "golfing epiphany". This was an improvement in his ball striking which enabled him to often score in the high 70s to low 80s for 18 holes. He described this in one of his books as "in the 70s after 60". MacKenzie was one of the first prominent golf course designers who had not been a leading player.

Legacy

In the late 1920s, he moved to the United States, where he carried out some of his most notable work, although he continued to design courses outside that country as well. Today, he is remembered as the designer of some of the world's finest courses, among them Century Country Club (Purchase, New York), as MacKenzie was partners with Colt & Alison at the time the two built Century, from mid-1923 he was working with other partners when he designed Augusta National Golf Club (Augusta, Georgia), Cypress Point Club (Monterey Peninsula, California), Royal Melbourne Golf Club (Melbourne, Australia), Pasatiempo Golf Club (Santa Cruz, California), Crystal Downs Country Club (Frankfort, Michigan), Lahinch Golf Course (Lahinch, Ireland), and Meadow Club (Fairfax, California) [see extended list of his courses below].

MacKenzie died in Santa Cruz, California, in January 1934, two months before the inaugural Masters Tournament (then known as the Augusta National Invitational Tournament). Discovered after his death was an unpublished manuscript on golf and golf course design, which was posthumously published as The Spirit of St. Andrews (MacKenzie 1995).

Bibliography
 MacKenzie, Alister (1915), "Military Entrenchments" in Golf Illustrated. Vol 3 No 1, pp. 42–45.
 MacKenzie, Alister [unsigned article, but authorship claimed by MacKenzie] (1919), "Entrenchments and Camouflage: Lecture by a British Officer Skilled in Landscape Gardening" in Professional Memoirs, Corps of Engineers, U.S. Army and Engineer Department at Large. No 47, pp. 574–638.
 MacKenzie, Alister (1920), Golf Architecture: Economy in Course Construction and Green-Keeping. London UK: Simpkin, Marshall, Hamilton, Kent and Co. Ltd.
 MacKenzie, Alister (1934), "Common Sense of Camouflage Defence" in The Military Engineer. Vol XXVI No 145 (January–February), pp. 42–44.
 MacKenzie, Alister (1995). The Spirit of St. Andrews. Sleeping Bear Press. .

Further reading
 Behrens, Roy R. (2009), CAMOUPEDIA: A Compendium of Research on Art, Architecture and Camouflage. Dysart, Iowa: Bobolink Books. .
 Doak, Tom (2001), The Life and Work of Dr. Alister MacKenzie. New York: John Wiley. .
 Green, John (2011), The Royal Melbourne Golf Club, History of the Courses. .
 Muirhead, Desmond (July 1995), "Symbols in Golf Course Architecture" in Executive Golfer.

References

External links

Golf course architects
World Golf Hall of Fame inductees
19th-century English medical doctors
People of the Second Boer War
People educated at Queen Elizabeth Grammar School, Wakefield
People from Wakefield
1870 births
1934 deaths